Robert E. Billiot (born November 1953) is an American politician who served as a member of the Louisiana House of Representatives for the 83rd district from 2008 to 2020.

Education 
Billot graduated from West Jefferson High School in Harvey, Louisiana and earned a Bachelor of Arts degree from Nicholls State University.

Career 
Billiot served as the mayor of Westwego, Louisiana from 1990 to 2008. He was elected to the Louisiana House of Representatives in 2007 and assumed office in 2008. During his tenure, Billiot worked to expand the Louisiana Drug Policy Board. He also sponsored legislation to fund workers' compensation coverage for volunteer firefighters. Billiot was unable to seek re-election in 2019 due to term limits and left office in 2020.

In March 2021, Billiot was re-elected mayor of Westwego, Louisiana.

References 

1953 births
Living people
People from Harvey, Louisiana
West Jefferson High School (Louisiana) alumni
Nicholls State University alumni
Democratic Party members of the Louisiana House of Representatives
21st-century American politicians